The Defence Security and Vetting Service (formerly the Defence Security Authority) is an agency in the Strategic Policy and Intelligence of the Australian Department of Defence responsible for protective security, providing vetting services, developing security policy, investigating major security incidents and monitoring security performance. It is the parent agency for the Australian Government Security Vetting Agency (AGSVA) and manages the Defence Industry Security Program (DISP).

Functions 

It monitors and reports on security compliance, performance and risks; grants security clearances for Defence and Defence Industry Security Program members, conducts clearance revalidations and re-evaluations; develops and promulgates security policy that complies with Australian Government protective security policy and meets Defence's needs and assisting Groups and the Services with security policy implementation.

See also 
Defense Security Service
Direction de la Protection et de la Sécurité de la Défense

References

External links
 Defence Security Authority
 Open Australia Search: Parliamentary records mentioning 'defence security authority'.

Australian intelligence agencies